Jean-Gunnar Lindgren (18 September 1905 – 23 February 1983) was a Swedish long-distance runner who competed at the 1928 and 1932 Summer Olympics. In 1928, he abandoned his 3,000 m steeplechase race and finished fourth in the 10,000 m. In 1932 he ended fifth and sixth in the 5,000 and 10,000 m events. Lindgren held Swedish titles in the 5,000 m (1929, 1931 and 1934), 10,000 m (1928–31 and 1933–36) and 8 km cross country (1929–32).

References

1905 births
1983 deaths
Swedish male long-distance runners
Swedish male steeplechase runners
Olympic athletes of Sweden
Athletes (track and field) at the 1928 Summer Olympics
Athletes (track and field) at the 1932 Summer Olympics
People from Falun
Sportspeople from Dalarna County